Paul Victor Jules Signac (11 November 1863 – 15 August 1935) was a French Neo-Impressionist painter who, with Georges Seurat, helped develop the artistic technique Pointillism.

Biography 
Paul Signac was born in Paris on 11 November 1863. Signac studied architecture until, at the age of 18, he decided to pursue a career as a painter after attending an exhibition of Claude Monet's work. He sailed on the Mediterranean Sea, visiting the coasts of Europe and painting the landscapes he encountered. In later years, he also painted a series of watercolors of French harbor cities.

In 1884 he met Claude Monet and Georges Seurat. He was struck by the systematic working methods of Seurat and by his theory of colors and he became Seurat's faithful supporter, friend, and heir with his description of Neo-Impressionism and Divisionism method. Under Seurat's influence he abandoned the short brushstrokes of Impressionism to experiment with scientifically-juxtaposed small dots of pure color, intended to combine and blend not on the canvas, but in the viewer's eye, the defining feature of Pointillism.

The Mediterranean coast is a major theme across Signac's paintings. He left the capital each summer, to stay in the south of France in the village of Collioure or at St. Tropez, where he bought a house and invited his friends. He envisioned the south of France as the perfect location for a future anarchist utopia.

Signac, Albert Dubois-Pillet, Odilon Redon, and Seurat were among the founders of the Société des Artistes Indépendants. The association began in Paris 29 July 1884 with the organization of massive exhibitions, embracing as their motto, "Neither jury nor awards" (Sans jury ni récompense). "The purpose of Société des Artistes Indépendants—based on the principle of abolishing admission jury—is to allow the artists to present their works to public judgement with complete freedom". For the following three decades their annual exhibitions flourished and set the trends in art of the early twentieth century. Signac was a guiding force in the Société and was its President from 1908 until his death. 

In 1886 Signac met Vincent van Gogh in Paris. During 1887 the two artists regularly went to Asnières-sur-Seine together, where they painted such subjects as river landscapes and cafés. Initially, Van Gogh chiefly admired Signac's loose painting technique. Signac would also meet Toulouse Lautrec who was a friend of Van Gogh.

In March 1889, Signac visited Van Gogh at Arles. In 1890, during the banquet of the XX exhibition in Brussels, Lautrec challenged to a duel the artist Henri de Groux who criticized Van Gogh's works. Signac  declared he would continue to fight for Van Gogh’s honor if Lautrec was killed. De Groux apologized for the slight and left the group and the duel never took place.

The next year he made a short trip to Italy, seeing Genoa, Florence, and Naples.

In 1888, Signac discovered anarchist ideas by reading Élisée Reclus, Kropotkin, and Jean Grave, who all developed the ideas of anarchist communism. With his friends Angrand Cross, Maximilien Luce, and Camille Pissarro he contributed to Jean Grave's paper, Les Temps Nouveaux (New Times).

Signac loved sailing and began to travel in 1892, sailing a small boat to almost all the ports of France, to the Netherlands, and on the Mediterranean Sea as far as Constantinople, basing his boat at St. Tropez, which he later would make popular to other artists. From his various ports of call, Signac brought back vibrant, colorful watercolors, sketched rapidly from nature. From these sketches, he painted large studio canvases that are carefully composed of small, mosaic-like squares of color quite different from the tiny, variegated dots introduced and used by Seurat.
 
Signac experimented with various media. As well as oil paintings and watercolors he made etchings, lithographs, and many pen-and-ink sketches composed of small, laborious dots.

The Neo-Impressionists influenced the next generation: Signac inspired Henri Matisse and André Derain in particular, thus playing a decisive role in the evolution of Fauvism. Signac himself did not admire the style when it first appeared.

Having prospered well, his financial support of the arts was considerable. As donations, he sent regular cheques and made a gift of his works for five lotteries between 1895 and 1912. Signac's 1893 painting, In the Time of Harmony originally was entitled, In the Time of Anarchy, but political repression targeting the anarchists in France at this time forced him to change the title before the work could be accepted by a gallery.

At the 1905 Salon des Indépendants, Henri Matisse exhibited the proto-Fauve painting Luxe, Calme et Volupté. The brightly colored composition was painted in 1904 after a summer spent working in St. Tropez on the French Riviera alongside the neo-Impressionist painters Henri-Edmond Cross and Paul Signac. The painting is Matisse's most important work in which he used the Divisionist technique advocated by Signac, which Matisse had adopted in 1898 after reading Signac's essay, d'Eugène Delacroix au Néo-Impressionnisme. Signac purchased the work after the 1905 Salon des Indépendants. In 1908 Signac was elected president of the Twenty-fourth Salon des Indépendants.

As president of the Société des Artistes Indépendants, from 1908 until his death, Signac encouraged younger artists by exhibiting the controversial works of the Fauves and the Cubists. He was the first patron to buy a painting by Matisse.

Signac served as a juror with Florence Meyer Blumenthal in awarding the Prix Blumenthal, a grant given between 1919 and 1954 to painters, sculptors, decorators, engravers, writers, and musicians.

Personal life 
On 7 November 1892, Signac married Berthe Roblès at the town hall of the 18th arrondissement of Paris. The witnesses at the wedding were Alexandre Lemonier, Maximilien Luce, Camille Pissarro, and Georges Lecomte.

In November 1897, the Signacs moved to a new apartment in the Castel Béranger, which was built by Hector Guimard. A little later, in December of the same year, they acquired a house in Saint-Tropez named, La Hune, where the painter had a vast studio constructed that he inaugurated on 16 August 1898.

In September 1913, Signac rented a house at Antibes, where he took up residence with Jeanne Selmersheim-Desgrange. She gave birth to their daughter, Ginette, on 2 October 1913. Meanwhile, Signac left La Hune and the Castel Beranger apartment to Berthe and they remained friends for the rest of his life. On 6 April 1927, Signac formally adopted Ginette. His granddaughter, Françoise Cachin, was an art historian.

Paul Signac died from sepsis in Paris on 15 August 1935 at the age of 71. His body was cremated and was interred three days later, on 18 August, at the Père Lachaise Cemetery.

Author 
Signac wrote several important works on the theory of art, among them, From Eugène Delacroix to Neo-Impressionism, first published in serial form in 1898. It is an important history of color and explanation of neo-impressionist technique. It also discusses Johan Barthold Jongkind (1819–1891). Signac also authored several introductions to the catalogues of art exhibitions and many other writings yet to be published.

Politically, he was an anarchist, as were many of his friends, including Félix Fénéon and Camille Pissarro.

Gallery

Illustrations in periodicals 
 L'almanach de Cocagne pour l'an 1920–1922, Dédié aux vrais Gourmands Et aux Francs Buveurs (1921), published by Jean Cocteau and Bertrand Guégan (1892–1943)
 La Gerbe (Nantes), periodical.

See also
 List of Orientalist artists
 Orientalism
The Lagoon of Saint Mark, Venice (1905)

Notes

References 
 
 Signac 1863–1935, Réunion des Musées Nationaux, Paris 2001 
 The New Encyclopædia Britannica, 1988, Volume 10, Micropædia, pg. 796

External links 

 Works by Signac at the Musée d'Orsay, Paris
 Finding Aid for Paul Signac letters and Signac family correspondence, 1860–1935, Getty Research Institute
 Woodcuts by Paul Signac, Henriette Tirman, Henri Ottmann and others, La Gebre, 1921/04 (A3, N31), Gallica, BnF
 Detail about Paul Signac's 1886 three month visit to Les Andelys that crystallised his theories around Pointillism.

1863 births
1935 deaths
19th-century French painters
20th-century French painters
20th-century male artists
Orientalist painters
Painters from Paris
Burials at Père Lachaise Cemetery
Divisionist painters
French anarchists
French male painters
Peintres de la Marine
Pointillism
Post-impressionist painters
Prix Blumenthal